Sachin railway station is a small railway station in Surat district, Gujarat, India. Station code of Sachin is SCH. The station consists of three platforms. The platforms are not well sheltered. It lacks many facilities including water and sanitation. The station lies on the Mumbai–Ahmedabad–Jaipur–Delhi main line. Sachin is also in Western Dedicated Freight Corridor of India.

Major trains

 59037/38 Virar–Surat Passenger
 19033/34 Gujarat Queen (Valsad–Ahmedabad)
 59441/42 Ahmedabad–Mumbai Central Passenger
 12921/22 Flying Ranee (Mumbai Central–Surat)
 59049/50 Valsad–Viramgam Passenger
 59439/40 Mumbai Central–Ahmedabad Passenger
 69149/50 Virar–Bharuch MEMU
 69141/42 Sanjan–Surat MEMU
 69151/52 Valsad–Surat MEMU†
 09069 Vapi–Surat Passenger Special
 69139 Borivali–Surat MEMU
 09070 Surat–Valsad MEMU Special
 59048 Surat–Valsad Shuttle 

†Note: Rake sharing with 69111/12 Surat–Vadodara MEMU and 69153/54 Umargam Road–Valsad MEMU

Notes

References

External links 

 Wikimapia

Railway stations in Surat district
Mumbai WR railway division